Félix-Houphouët-Boigny International Airport , also known as Port Bouët Airport, is located  south east of Abidjan, Ivory Coast. It is the largest airport in the country for air traffic. The airport is the main hub of the national airline Air Côte d'Ivoire. Named after the first president of Ivory Coast, Félix Houphouët-Boigny, this international airport is directly connected currently to four different airports in Europe and to many destinations within the rest of Africa and the Middle East. The airport is served by over 20 airlines, covering more than 36 destinations.

History 

The airport is managed by Aeria, a private Ivorian company, who continually developed the airport over the decades and contributing to making it one of the most modern and one of the main hubs of West Africa. It is also a strategic piece of infrastructure for both the delivery of military equipment and, in times of unrest, the evacuation of foreign nationals.

Air Afrique, which was based in Abidjan, ceased all flights in January 2002. Among the airline's routes in its final years was one from Abidjan to New York via Dakar, which was operated by Airbus A300s and A310s.

Disturbances that took place in Ivory Coast in the early 2000s had a negative impact on the airport. In November 2004, during the French–Ivorian clashes that occurred in Abidjan, the airport was looted and damaged. It was taken back by French troops and returned to the Ivorian government in the second half of November. The airport was later refurbished by the Ivorian government and modernized with new modern facilities.

On the night of 2 to 3 April 2011, the airport was again taken by the French troops in order to evacuate French nationals and foreigners, as the final assault against the presidential palace was announced, during the battle for Abidjan. After the civil war ended in April 2011, the airport was returned to the Ivorian government and development projects, paused for almost a decade, were restarted.

Following the gradual recovery of economic activities in Ivory Coast from 2012, investments and projects to increase the capacity of the airport, provided in March 2010, are in the works since October 2011.

In February 2012, Abdoulaye Coulibaly, president of Aeria's board of directors, indicated that he wanted to make the airport suitable for the Airbus A380. Air France did not deny that it could eventually use the A380 on the Paris-Abidjan route if there were sufficiently strong economic growth.

On 4 May 2012, PROPARCO loans 10 billion CFA francs (15 million euros) to Aeria to fund a major expansion and modernization program for the airport. This loan is part of the renewal of Aeria's concession, effective 1 January 2010, for a period of 20 years. This concession provides investment programs in increments of five years. The first slice of 24 million dollars, includes the renovation of the international terminal, the rehabilitation of the charter terminal and development of new infrastructure.

In addition, the refurbishment included an extension of the international terminal of a surface 11 000 to 26 000 m2, the refurbishment of the aircraft parking area, renovation of access roads and the construction of a new parking lot. The ultimate goal is to create a commercial zone next to the airport, with a lodging area, hangars, a convention center, a free zone, office buildings, warehouses, exhibition halls, a shopping center and housing for dedicated staff. On 16 June 2012, the Radisson Hotels group announced the laying of the first stone of the Radisson Blu hotel on the airport grounds. The Radisson Blu opened in the spring of 2016 and has over 200 rooms and suites, as well as a restaurant, outdoor pool and fitness center. Also on the airport grounds, ONOMO Hotels operates a 118-room select-service property. Both the ONOMO and the Radisson Blu are accessible from the passenger terminal via shuttle buses.

Following discussions with the Ivorian government, Ethiopian Airlines commenced direct flights to Newark aboard Boeing 787 equipment in May 2018. The company signed a codeshare agreement with Air Côte d'Ivoire to attract passengers.

Tens of thousands were left homeless in January 2020 as homes in Adjoufou, a shanty town near the airport, were demolished, officially for safety reasons. Residents said they were targeted because they are poor. Two months later, at the beginning of the COVID-19 pandemic, Ethiopian suspended its link to Newark. The carrier ultimately decided not to resume the service, as it had been unprofitable.

Airlines and destinations

Passenger

Cargo

Statistics
Before the decade of political and military turmoil, the Felix-Houphouet-Boigny airport was among the most important in West Africa, with passenger traffic exceeding one million travelers in the late 1990s. The succession of political and military crises seriously affected the country's image and reduced the importance of the airport in the sub-region in terms of traffic, but in recent years, as stability and strong economic growth have returned, airport traffic has been growing at a fast pace, and is now at its highest ever. In 2021, the airport handled 1,514,629 passengers.

Ground transport
The airport is to be served by the new Abidjan Metro, construction of which started in November 2017. The metro should enter commercial service in 2022 and reach the airport by mid-2023.

Accidents and incidents 
3 January 1987: a Varig Boeing 707-379C registration PP-VJK operating flight 797 from Abidjan to Rio de Janeiro-Galeão crashed due to a failure on engine 1 shortly after take-off. While attempting to return to the airport for an emergency landing, it crashed on a field 18 km away from Abidjan's airport. Of the 51 passengers and crew aboard, a single passenger survived.
30 January 2000: Kenya Airways flight 431, crashed into the sea shortly after take-off from Port Bouet. Of the 179 passengers and crew on board the Airbus A310, only ten people survived.

References

External links 

 Website Official
 A-Z World Airports Online: Abidjan International Airport (ABJ/DIAP) 

Airports in Ivory Coast
Buildings and structures in Abidjan
Transport in Abidjan